Contes is a commune in the Pas-de-Calais department in the Hauts-de-France region of France.

Geography
The rivers Canche and Planquette converge at Contes.

Population

See also
Communes of the Pas-de-Calais department

References

External links

 Contes sur le site du Quid 

Communes of Pas-de-Calais
Artois